The Punxsutawney Policemen were a minor league baseball team based in Punxsutawney, Pennsylvania. In 1906 and 1907, the Policemen played as members of the Class D level Interstate League, before folding during the 1907 season. The Policemen hosted home games at the Punxsutawney Diamond.

History
Punxsutawney hosted semi–pro teams prior to beginning full minor league play. In 1900, Baseball Hall of Fame member Rube Waddell was suspended for two months by the Pittsburgh Pirates, during which time he pitched for the Punxsutawney team.

In 1906, Punxsutawney began minor league play, when the Punxsutawney "Policemen" became members of the eight–team Class D level Interstate League. The Bradford Drillers, DuBois Miners, Erie Sailors, Hornell Pigmies, Kane Mountaineers, Oil City Oilers and Olean Refiners teams joined Punxsutawney in beginning league play on May 14, 1906.

The use of the "Policemen" moniker corresponds to the Pennsylvania State Police Troop D policemen being headquartered in Punxsutawney in the era.

Punxsutawney and the other Interstate League franchises operated with a team salary cap of $750 per month for the total roster. The league rules required the host team to guarantee the visiting team $50.00 per game, with a rain guarantee of $25.00. On Saturdays and holidays, the home team's gate receipts were to be divided equally by both teams.

In their first season of play, the Punxsutawney Policemen placed 2nd in the Interstate League. Finishing with a record of 53–45, the Policemen were managed by W.J. Brown. In the final standings, Punxsutawney finished 8.0 games behind the 1st place Erie Fisherman.

In their final season, the 1907 Punxsutawney Policemen folded before the season was completed. On August 3, 1907, the Policemen franchise folded. After beginning 1907 play in the eight–team league, Punxsutawney ended their final season with a record of 33–26 as Milt Montgomery and W. J. Brown served as managers. Punxsutawney and the other teams of the Interstate League were plagued by bad weather and corresponding financial troubles in 1907, with Erie being the only league franchise without debt.

The Interstate League continued play in 1908, but the Punxsutawney Policemen  did not return as a league franchise. Punxsutawney has not hosted another minor league team.

The ballpark
The Punxsutawney Policemen home ballpark was referred to by the local Punxsutawney Spirit newspaper as the Punxsutawney Diamond. Barclay Square  was in use in the era, having began as a public park in 1822. Today, the park hosts the Groundhog Day celebration in Punxsutawney.

Timeline

Year–by–year records

Notable alumni

Jim Clark (1906)
Bob Dresser (1906)
John McDonald (1906)
Roxey Roach (1906-1907)

See also
Punxsutawney Policemen  players

References

External links
Punxsutawney - Baseball Reference

Defunct minor league baseball teams
Baseball teams established in 1906
Baseball teams disestablished in 1907
Defunct baseball teams in Pennsylvania
Defunct Interstate League teams
Jefferson County, Pennsylvania